The Unscarred, also known as Everybody Dies, is a 2000 British-German thriller film produced and directed by Buddy Giovinazzo.

Cast 
 James Russo as Mickey Vernon 
 Ornella Muti as Rafaella 
 Heino Ferch as Johann 
 Steven Waddington as Travis Moore 
 Ulrike Haase as Anke
 Richard Portnow as Tommy Matolla  
 Naike Rivelli as Young Rafaella

References

External links

2000 films
2000 thriller films
British thriller films
German thriller films
English-language German films
2000s English-language films
2000s British films
2000s German films